J85 may refer to:

General Electric J85, a small single-shaft turbojet engine
HMS Seagull (J85), a Halcyon class minesweeper of Royal Navy
J85, the Johnson solid notation for a snub square antiprism
LNER Class J85, a class of British steam locomotives